The Lincoln Monument is a bronze statue of Abraham Lincoln that commemorates his 1832 service in the Black Hawk War.  Located in President's Park in Dixon, Illinois, the bronze statue was sculpted by Leonard Crunelle and was dedicated on September 24, 1930.  The memorial is maintained by the Illinois Historic Preservation Agency as a state historic site. 

The inscription reads:
(On back of base, north side under relief of John Dixon:) 
JOHN DIXON
FOUNDER OF THE CITY OF DIXON
APRIL 11, 1830 - PROPRIETOR
OF THE FERRY AND TAVERN HERE
DURING THE BLACK HAWK WAR 
(Under relief of Ft. Dixon:) 
FORT DIXON IN 1832 
(Under relief of a tavern, wagon, and boat:) 
DIXON TAVERN AND FERRY 1830 
(Front of base:) 
LINCOLN

See also
Lincoln Tomb
List of statues of Abraham Lincoln
List of sculptures of presidents of the United States

References

External links
Lincoln Monument - Illinois Historic Preservation Agency

Illinois State Historic Sites
Dixon, Illinois
Monuments and memorials in Illinois
Dixon, Illinois
Outdoor sculptures in Illinois
Tourist attractions in Lee County, Illinois
1930 sculptures
Bronze sculptures in Illinois
Statues in Illinois
1930 establishments in Illinois
Sculptures of men in Illinois
Monuments and memorials to Abraham Lincoln in the United States